Fiona Murtagh (born 11 July 1995) is an Irish rower. She competed in the women's coxless four event at the 2020 Summer Olympics and won a bronze medal. Murtagh attended Fordham University from 2012 to 2016 on a rowing scholarship. Along with her team-mates, she was named as the Irish Times/Sport Ireland Sportswoman for July 2021.

References

External links
 
 Fiona Murtagh at Rowing Ireland
 

1995 births
Living people
Irish female rowers
Olympic rowers of Ireland
Fordham Rams athletes
College women's rowers in the United States
Sportspeople from Galway (city)
Rowers at the 2020 Summer Olympics
Medalists at the 2020 Summer Olympics
Olympic medalists in rowing
Olympic bronze medalists for Ireland